Ring of Steel is a 1942 short documentary film directed by Garson Kanin and narrated by Spencer Tracy. "Dedicated to the American Soldier", the film was released on April 2, 1942, and distributed free to all U.S. theaters. The film was produced by Warner Bros. and the United States Office for Emergency Management.

Synopsis
Spencer Tracy narrates a tribute to U.S. soldiers from 1776 to 1943, who have forged a "ring of steel" to protect American democracy.

Production
Tracy's narration was recorded at the Long Island studio of the Army Signal Corps on February 19, 1942.

Reputation
The Academy Film Archive preserved Ring of Steel in 2012. The film is part of the Academy War Film Collection, one of the largest collections of World War II era short films held outside government archives.

See also 
List of Allied Propaganda Films of World War 2

References

External links 
 
 

1942 films
American World War II propaganda shorts
Films directed by Garson Kanin
American black-and-white films
American short documentary films
1940s short documentary films
1940s English-language films
1940s American films